Petrus Antonius Aegidius Gerardus "Piet" Legierse (born 27 February 1946) is a retired Dutch road cyclist who was active between 1965 and 1973. He won the Olympia's Tour in 1969 and one stage of Tour de Luxembourg in 1970. He married the cyclist Trudy Steenvoort in 1968 or 1969.

References

1946 births
Living people
Dutch male cyclists
People from Oostflakkee
Cyclists from South Holland